Ross Xavier Vasta (born 8 October 1966) is an Australian politician who has been a member of the House of Representatives since 2010, representing the Division of Bonner for the Liberal Party. He previously held the same seat from 2004 to 2007.

Early life
Vasta is the son of Angelo Vasta, a former judge of the Supreme Court of Queensland who was stood down after his friendship with the disgraced Queensland Police Commissioner Terence Lewis became known. His parents were both born in Innisfail, Queensland, while his grandparents were all born in Sicily. His mother registered him as an Italian citizen by descent when he was a child, but he renounced it prior to his first run for parliament in 2001. Vasta was educated at Villanova College in the Brisbane suburb of Coorparoo, and attended Griffith University, where he graduated with a commerce degree. He ran and operated three family-owned Italian cuisine restaurants named Elio's and worked as a company director before entering politics. He is the brother of Salvatore Vasta, a judge of the Federal Circuit Court.

Politics
At the 2001 federal election, Vasta was the Liberal Party candidate for the Division of Griffith. He was defeated by the sitting member, Kevin Rudd, who later became Prime Minister of Australia.

In the 2004 federal election, Vasta stood for the Liberals in the Division of Bonner, and defeated former Labor minister Con Sciacca. However, in the 2007 election he was defeated by Labor candidate Kerry Rea on a swing of 4.75 points, the lowest swing against a Liberal incumbent in Queensland. Following his election defeat, Vasta won Liberal Party preselection for the Brisbane City Council ward of Wynnum-Manly in Brisbane's east. He was defeated by the Labor incumbent, polling 36% of the primary vote.

Vasta decided to stand in Bonner once again at the 2010 federal election, and reclaimed his old seat by a 53% to 47% margin. He achieved a seven-point swing towards him, one of the highest of any Liberal candidate in Queensland.

Vasta was nominated to the speaker's panel in 2013 and has served as chair of the standing committees on privileges and parliamentary procedure. In 2015 he was a candidate to succeed Bronwyn Bishop as Speaker of the House of Representatives.

Vasta is a member of the centre-right faction of the Liberal Party.

Notes

External links
 Liberal Party Profile
 Personal Page

1966 births
Liberal Party of Australia members of the Parliament of Australia
Liberal National Party of Queensland members of the Parliament of Australia
Living people
Members of the Australian House of Representatives for Bonner
Members of the Australian House of Representatives
Australian people of Sicilian descent
People educated at Villanova College (Australia)
Australian politicians of Italian descent
Griffith University alumni
Politicians from Melbourne
21st-century Australian politicians
People who lost Italian citizenship
Citizens of Italy through descent